Saranga Baichu (born 11 July 1938) is a Guyanese cricketer. He played in two first-class matches for British Guiana in 1958/59.

See also
 List of Guyanese representative cricketers

References

External links
 

1938 births
Living people
Guyanese cricketers
Guyana cricketers